Daniele Formica (10 June 1949 – 1 February 2011) was an Irish-born Italian actor, voice actor, theatre director, playwright and television personality.

Formica was best known for portraying comical characters in various Italian comedy films in the 1980s as well as his roles in the theatre. He also appeared in the 1980 variety comedy television show A tutto gag.

Biography
Born in Drogheda, County Louth, in Ireland, the son of Wilson Formica, an Irish violinist of Italian origin and Eugenia Ravasio, an Italian maid, Formica studied at Trinity College, Dublin, then made his stage debut in the early seventies in Rabelais by Jean-Louis Barrault.

In 1973, Formica moved to Italy where he joined the stage company of the Teatro Stabile dell'Aquila with whom he acted in Maschere by Carlo Goldoni; in those years he made his first appearances in films and TV dramas. He obtained his major successes in the 1980s, taking part to a number of important TV shows, then, from the 1990s, he focused on theatre.

As a voice actor, Formica made several voice acting appearances in at least three Pixar films. He typically dubbed the voices of villainous or minor characters. For example, he voiced Randall Boggs in the Italian dubbed version of Monsters, Inc. as well as Gilbert Huph in the Italian dubbed version of The Incredibles.

Death
On 1 February 2011 Formica died in Bassano del Grappa in Veneto at age 61 of pancreatic cancer.

Filmography

Cinema
Cerca di capirmi (1970)
Bruciati da cocente passione (1976)
Sex Diary (1976)
L'amore è un salto di qualità (1977)
A Dangerous Toy (1979)
Prickly Pears (1980)
I'm Getting a Yacht (1980)
I carabbimatti (1981)
Camera d'albergo (1981)
Don't Play with Tigers (1982)
Rosso veneziano (1989)
Stelle di cartone (1993)
Uno a me, uno a te e uno a Raffaele (1994)
Carogne - Ciro and me (1995)
Intolerance (1996)
Ladri si nasce (1997) - Film TV
Dio c'è (1998)
Il piazzista (2007)
Pa-ra-da (2008)
Ti stramo - Ho voglia di un'ultima notte da manuale prima di tre baci sopra il cielo (2008)
L'ultima estate (2009)
Tutta colpa della musica (2011)

Dubbing roles

Animation
Randall Boggs in Monsters, Inc. 
Gilbert Huph in The Incredibles
Dusty Rust-eze in Cars 
Wesley in Home on the Range
Mr. Willerstein in Meet the Robinsons
Lofty Thaddeus Worthington in Valiant
Mr. Gasket in Robots
JP in Pets

Live action
Inspector Gadget in Inspector Gadget 2
Sheik Abdul ben Falafel in The Cannonball Run
Sheik Abdul ben Falafel in Cannonball Run II
Embry Wallis in The Greatest Game Ever Played
The Whale in The Hitchhiker's Guide to the Galaxy

References

External links
 
 
 
 

1949 births
2011 deaths
Alumni of Trinity College Dublin
People from Drogheda
People from Bassano del Grappa
20th-century Italian male actors
21st-century Italian male actors
20th-century Italian dramatists and playwrights
21st-century Italian dramatists and playwrights
Italian male film actors
Italian male stage actors
Italian male television actors
Italian male voice actors
Italian theatre directors
Italian male dramatists and playwrights
Italian television personalities
Italian people of Irish descent
Irish emigrants to Italy
Deaths from cancer in Veneto
Deaths from pancreatic cancer
20th-century Italian male writers